Diethyl chlorophosphate is an organophosphorus compound with the formula (C2H5O)2P(O)Cl.  As an reagent in organic synthesis, it is use the convert alcohols to the corresponding diethylphosphate esters. It is a colorless liquid with a fruity odor. It is a corrosive, and as a cholinesterase inhibitor, highly toxic through dermal absorption.  The molecule is tetrahedral.

Synthesis and reactions
The compound is prepared by the chlorination of diethylphosphite with carbon tetrachloride (Atherton–Todd reaction).

The compound is electrophilic.  Controlled hydrolysis gives tetraethyl pyrophosphate.  Alcohols react to vie mixed phosphate esters:

(C2H5O)2P(O)Cl  +  ROH  →  (C2H5O)2P(O)OR  +  HCl
The reagent is routinely employed in organic synthesis for phosphorylation of carboxylates, alcohols, and amines.

See also
 Diethyl chlorophosphate at www.chemicalbook.com.

References

Ethyl esters